Wangoi is a town and a Municipal Council in Imphal West district in the Indian state of Manipur.

Demographics
 India census, Wangoi had a population of 7872. Males constitute 50% of the population and females 50%. Wangoi has an average literacy rate of 64%, higher than the national average of 59.5%: male literacy is 76%, and female literacy is 53%. In Wangoi, 13% of the population is under 6 years of age.

Politics
Wangoi is part of Inner Manipur (Lok Sabha constituency).

References

Cities and towns in Imphal West district